Acleris comandrana is a species of moth of the family Tortricidae. It is found in North America, where it has been recorded from Maine, Maryland, Massachusetts and New Mexico.

The wingspan is about 12 mm. Adults have been recorded on wing from April to August and from October to November.

The larvae feed on Comandra species.

References

Moths described in 1892
comandrana
Moths of North America